Hana Bobková (19 February 1929 – 1 July 2017), also known as Hana Vláčilová, was a Czech gymnast who competed in the 1952 Summer Olympics.

Bobková died on 1 July 2017, at the age of 88.

References

External links
 
 

1929 births
2017 deaths
Czech female artistic gymnasts
Olympic gymnasts of Czechoslovakia
Olympic bronze medalists for Czechoslovakia
Olympic medalists in gymnastics
Gymnasts at the 1952 Summer Olympics
Medalists at the 1952 Summer Olympics
Gymnasts from Prague